Saidi Tambwe (born 30 January 1952) is a Tanzanian boxer. He competed in the men's flyweight event at the 1972 Summer Olympics.

References

1952 births
Living people
Tanzanian male boxers
Olympic boxers of Tanzania
Boxers at the 1972 Summer Olympics
Place of birth missing (living people)
Flyweight boxers